The 1999 American League Championship Series (ALCS) was a matchup between the East Division Champion New York Yankees (98–64) and the Wild Card Boston Red Sox (94–68). The Yankees had advanced to the Series after sweeping the West Division Champion Texas Rangers in the AL Division Series for the second consecutive year, and the Red Sox advanced by beating the Central Division Champion Cleveland Indians three games to two. The Yankees won the series, 4-1.  They won their 36th American League pennant and went on to win the World Series against the Atlanta Braves.

Summary
Both teams came into the series on a roll; New York had swept the Texas Rangers for the second straight year in the 1999 American League Division Series and Boston had come from two games down to defeat the Cleveland Indians in their division series. In the first post-season series between the two rivals, the Yankees won in five games.

New York Yankees vs. Boston Red Sox

Game summaries

Game 1
Wednesday, October 13, 1999, at Yankee Stadium (I) in Bronx, New York

Before the 1999 ALCS, Yogi Berra famously took Bernie Williams aside, smiled, and offered a word of advice for Williams, who was admittedly nervous before the start of the series between the two rivals: "Relax. We’ve been beating these guys for 80 years."

Game 1 was a matchup between Kent Mercker and Orlando Hernández. Hernández, the soon-to-be-named ALCS MVP, got into trouble in the first two innings. In the first, after a leadoff single by José Offerman, John Valentin reached on an error by Derek Jeter, scoring Offerman for the first run of the game. Valentin then scored on Brian Daubach's single to right. It looked like the Red Sox were ready to clobber the Yankees, but no more runs would score in the inning. In the top of the second, Darren Lewis scored on an infield hit in the second to give Boston a 3-0 lead, but the Yankees' resilience showed itself in the bottom half. With Shane Spencer on first with two out, Scott Brosius slugged a home run to make it a one-run game. The duel continued into the seventh when, with Derek Lowe pitching, Brosius singled to lead off the inning. A sacrifice bunt by Chuck Knoblauch moved him into scoring position. Jeter singled to center and drove in Brosius to tie the game. Small ball helped the Yankees tie the game, but the long ball would win it in the bottom of the tenth. Rod Beck came on in relief and promptly gave up a leadoff homer to Bernie Williams to lose the game for the Red Sox. The Yankees had a one-game lead in the series.

Game 2
Thursday, October 14, 1999, at Yankee Stadium (I) in Bronx, New York

Game 2 pitted Ramón Martínez against David Cone. After grabbing a 1–0 lead behind a solo home run in the fourth inning by Tino Martinez, the Red Sox responded in the fifth inning when Jose Offerman hit a leadoff single and two outs later, Nomar Garciaparra homered to put them up 2−1. In the seventh inning, Ricky Ledee drew a leadoff walk, moved to second on a sacrifice bunt, and scored on Chuck Knoblauch's double to tie the game. Tom Gordon relieved Martinez and walked Derek Jeter, then Rhéal Cormier relieved Gordon and allowed a single to Paul O'Neill put the Yankees ahead 3−2. The lead would stand and Mariano Rivera, who won Game 1, got the save in the ninth inning to put the Yankees up two games going to Fenway Park.

Game 3
Saturday, October 16, 1999, at Fenway Park in Boston, Massachusetts

Game 3 was the long anticipated matchup between Pedro Martínez and Roger Clemens, but the Red Sox would come out swinging, scoring in all but two innings. After a leadoff triple by Jose Offerman in the first, John Valentin homered to put the Red Sox ahead 2–0. Next inning, Clemens allowed a one-out double to Trot Nixon and subsequent single to Offerman before Valentin's groundout scored Nixon. After Jason Varitek walked, Nomar Garciaparra's double scored Offerman to make it 4−0. Clemens was done in the third inning after allowing a leadoff single to Mike Stanley as Red Sox fans chanted "Where is Roger?" and then a response chant of "In the Shower". Hideki Irabu fared worse in relief as Brian Daubach's home run made it 6−0. Daubach and Darren Lewis hit back-to-back leadoff doubles in the fifth and the latter scored on Offerman's single two outs later to make it 8−0. Next inning, Yankees left fielder Ricky Ledee's error on Daubach's fly ball allowed Troy O'Leary to score all the way from first. In the seventh, Nixon hit a leadoff single, moved to second on a groundout, and scored on Valetin's single. One out later, Garciaparra's home run made it 12−0. O'Leary then doubled to left and scored Boston's last run on Stanley's single. Martinez, for his part, pitched brilliantly, striking out 12 Yankees in seven scoreless innings and allowing just two hits. He would finish 1999 with a streak of 17 scoreless innings in the playoffs. The Yankees scored their only run on Scott Brosius's home run off of Tom Gordon in the eighth. The Red Sox would go on to win 13–1 and make the series two games to one. Boston's victory also snapped a 10-game losing streak in LCS games dating back to 1988 which remains the longest such streak in MLB history to this day.

Game 4
Sunday, October 17, 1999, at Fenway Park in Boston, Massachusetts

Game 4 pitted Andy Pettitte against Bret Saberhagen. The Yankees would score first after Darryl Strawberry hit a home run to silence the crowd chants of "Darryl, Darryl" and "Just say no" in his first at-bat. The Red Sox would tie it in the bottom half when Butch Huskey doubled with one out and scored on Troy O'Leary's single. Next inning Damon Buford hit a one out single, stole second and scored on Jose Offerman's single to put the Red Sox ahead 2–1. In the fourth, Bernie Williams singled with one out, reaching second on an error, before scoring on Tino Martinez's double to tie the game. After Darryl Strawberry was intentionally walked and Scott Brosius struck out, another error on Chad Curtis's ground ball allowed Martinez to score to put the Yankees up 3−2. The score remained the same until the Yankees blew the game open with six runs in the ninth. Chuck Knoblauch and Derek Jeter hit back-to-back one out singles off of Rich Garces, then an errant throw on Paul O'Neill's ground ball allowed Knoblauch to score. Williams's single scored Jeter before Martinez was intentionally walked. Rod Beck relieved Garces and allowed a grand slam to Ricky Ledée to cap the scoring at 9−2. The Yankees were one win away from the World Series.

This game also featured the infamous trash throwing incident by fans when Jimy Williams was ejected from the game after arguing when Nomar Garciaparra was called out at first in the ninth inning, which followed a blown call by umpire Tim Tschida on Chuck Knoblauch's tag attempt on José Offerman in the eighth inning. The blown call is now famously referred to as "The Phantom Tag".

Game 5
Monday, October 18, 1999, at Fenway Park in Boston, Massachusetts

Game 5 was a rematch between Mercker and Hernandez. Chuck Knoblauch singled to lead off the first and Jeter followed with a home run to put the Yankees up for good. They added to their lead in the seventh when Jeter reached second on an error and moved to third on Paul O'Neill's single off of Derek Lowe. Rhéal Cormier walked Bernie Williams to load the bases and another error on Chili Davis's ground ball allowed Jeter to score before Tino Martinez's RBI single made it 4−0 Yankees. El Duque kept the Red Sox in check, allowing only one run on a homer by Jason Varitek in the eighth. The Yankees added insurance in the ninth on Jorge Posada's two-run home run off of Tom Gordon. Both teams left eleven men on base and the Yankees would go on to win the pennant.

Composite box
1999 ALCS (4–1): New York Yankees over Boston Red Sox

Aftermath
In quite possibility the climax season of the Yankees dynasty, they swept the Braves in the World Series, winning their third World Series in four seasons. Their game three blow out loss to the Red Sox in this series was their only loss of the entire 1999 postseason. The Yankees would win another World Series in 2000, making it four championships in five seasons.

After the season, Pedro Martinez was beaten out for the 1999 American League Most Valuable Player Award by Rangers’ catcher Ivan Rodriguez due to being left off the ballot of two voters completely by Minneapolis’ LaVelle Neal and New York’s George King. In both their explanations, Neal and King believed that starting pitchers should not be considered for the Most Valuable Player as they only pitched once every 4-5 days. However, in King’s case, his point proved be contradictory. In the previous season, King had put two starting pitchers on his MVP ballot, the Yankees’ David Wells and the Texas Rangers’ Rick Helling. In fact, King’s vote for Helling was the only vote Helling received, as he went 20-7 with a 4.41 ERA. King later noted that he had a talk with friend after the 1998 MVP who convinced him that his earlier MVP votes were off base and that he should no longer vote for pitchers; however, many fans in Boston felt like it was a New York reporter sticking it to a Boston player. 

Pedro was spectacular in 1999, pitching to a 2.07 ERA to go with 313 strikeouts in 213 innings pitched. He pitched even better in 2000, but only placed 5th in MVP voting. His 1999-2000 seasons are widely considered two of the best pitched seasons in the modern era. Justin Verlander in 2011 was the first pitcher to win a MVP since Roger Clemens in 1986. Three years later, Clayton Kershaw became the first pitcher in the National League to win the MVP since Bob Gibson in 1968.

In 1999, the Red Sox were no match for the Yankees, as pretty much no team in baseball was during this era. However, with new ownership that allowed them to spend close to the Yankees in payroll, the Red Sox would be considered equals to the Yankees by 2003. This was seen in two classic post-season series in 2003 and 2004. In the 2003 American League Championship Series, the Yankees beat the Red Sox on a game seven walk-off by Aaron Boone home run in the 11th inning. Red Sox fans called Boone "Aaron Fucking Boone," much as they called Bucky Dent "Bucky Fucking Dent." In the 2004 American League Championship Series between the two rivals, the Red Sox would break through in dramatic fashion, becoming the first team in baseball history to comeback from a 3-0 deficit to win a post-season series. Boston went on to finish the job, sweeping the Cardinals and winning their first World Series since 1918.

References

External links
1999 ALCS at Baseball Reference

American League Championship Series
New York Yankees postseason
Boston Red Sox postseason
American League Championship Series
American League Championship Series
American League Championship Series
American League Championship Series
Baseball competitions in Boston
American League Championship Series
1990s in the Bronx
Baseball competitions in New York City